The Australian ten-pound note was a denomination of the Australian pound that was equivalent to twenty dollars on 14 February 1966. This denomination along with all other pound denomination is still legal tender = twenty dollar note.

It was first issued in 1911 on overprinted banknotes issued by the various commercial and state banks of the time. In 1913 the first Australian banknote was issued. It featured a scene of the carting wheat at Narwonah in New South Wales.

Timeline

1910
These banknotes were overprinted on private issue from various banks, signatures were Jas R Collins and Geo T Allen. A total of 152,675 banknotes were issued.

1913–1925
Signatories: Collins/Allen (1914–1917); Cerutty/Collins (1918–1924)
 
The first ten-pound note was issued in 1913, with 2,039,188 being printed. The reverse of the note possessed horizontal red/yellow bands.

1925–1934
Signatories: Kell/Collins (1925–1926); Riddle/Heathershaw (1927); Riddle/Sheehan (1933)

Designed and printed by Thomas S. Harrison, the note was made longer and narrower to improve printing efficiency (six notes could fit onto a sheet instead of four) and further security features were added: a basketweave watermark was used around the borders and the denomination appears in watermarks in the center of the note. 3,610,000 of these notes were printed.

1934–1966
Sheehan/McFarlane (1940); Armitage/McFarlane (1943); Coombs/Watt (1949); Coombs/Wilson (1952)

These were all legal tender and included two basic designs, those of 1934–40 has 3,076,000 issues, 1940–54 with 21,924,000 and 1954–66 with 61,151,000 banknotes issued.

See also

 Banknotes of the Australian pound

External links
Reserve Bank of Australia Museum
Australian stamp

Banknotes of Australia
1911 establishments in Australia
1966 disestablishments in Australia
Ten-base-unit banknotes